Garret Barry may refer to:

Garret Barry (piper) (1847–1899), blind Irish piper
Garret Barry (soldier) (died 1647), Irish soldier